Glavinitsa (also transliterated Glavinica or Glavinitza) is a town in northeastern Bulgaria, part of Silistra Province. It is the administrative centre of Glavinitsa Municipality, which lies in the southwestern part of Silistra Province, in the historical region of Southern Dobruja. As of December 2009, the town has a population of 1,928 inhabitants.

Glavinitsa is located in the eastern Danubian Plain, on the road between Dulovo and Tutrakan. Its old name (until 1942) was Asvatköy. Glavinitsa was proclaimed a town on 5 September 1984.

Glavinitsa Peak on Fallières Coast in Antarctica is named after the village.

Population
As of December 2018, the town of Glavinitsa has a dwindling population of 1,341 people, down from its peak of 2,583 people in 1985. The municipality of Glavinitsa has 9,897 inhabitants at the same time. 

The town of Glavinitsa has a mixed population, with ethnic Bulgarians constituting 64% of the population, followed by ethnic  Bulgaria with 29% and Romani people with 7%. Orthodox Christianity is the largest faith, followed by Islam.

Municipality

Glavinitsa municipality includes the following 23 places:

The population consists mostly of Bulgarians and Turks. There are 5 churches, 3 chapels and 17 mosques.

Notes

External links
 Glavinitsa municipality website 

Towns in Bulgaria
Populated places in Silistra Province